Central and North West London NHS Foundation Trust is an NHS Foundation Trust in England. It provides healthcare in London, Milton Keynes, Surrey and elsewhere. It was created in 2002 by a merger between Brent, Kensington & Chelsea and Westminster Mental Health NHS Trust, Harrow and Hillingdon Healthcare Trust, and the substance misuse service component of Hounslow and Spelthorne Community and Mental Health NHS Trust. It subsequently won additional contracts, including Milton Keynes Community Health Services from April 2013.  It has substantial contracts for prison health services. CNWL is a member of Imperial College Health Partners.

Professor Dorothy Griffiths was appointed as chair of the Trust in January 2014 following the retirement of Dame Ruth Runciman, who served the Trust for more than ten years.

In 2017 the trust established a subsidiary company, Quality Trusted Solutions Ltd, to which 35 staff were transferred. The intention was to achieve pay bill savings, by recruiting new staff on less expensive non-NHS contracts.

Performance

It was named by the Health Service Journal as one of the top hundred NHS trusts to work for in 2015.  At that time it had 5745 full-time equivalent staff and a sickness absence rate of 3.51%.

See also
 List of NHS trusts

References

External links

NHS foundation trusts
Health in London